Okoř is a municipality and village in Prague-West District in the Central Bohemian Region of the Czech Republic. It has about 100 inhabitants.

History
The first written mention of Okoř is in a deed of Ottokar I of Bohemia from 1227.

Sights
The municipality is known for the ruin of Okoř Castle.

References

Villages in Prague-West District